Zythos molybdina is a moth of the family Geometridae described by Louis Beethoven Prout in 1938. It is found in New Guinea.

Subspecies
Zythos molybdina molybdina
Zythos molybdina tombarensis (Prout, 1938) (New Britain)

References

Moths described in 1938
Scopulini